Paramorpha aulata is a moth in the family Carposinidae first described by Edward Meyrick in 1913. It is found in Sri Lanka.

References

Carposinidae
Moths described in 1913